Protocol II is a 1977 amendment protocol to the Geneva Conventions relating to the protection of victims of non-international armed conflicts. It defines certain international laws that strive to provide better protection for victims of internal armed conflicts that take place within the borders of a single country. The scope of these laws is more limited than those of the rest of the Geneva Conventions out of respect for sovereign rights and duties of national governments.

As of July 2020, the Protocol had been ratified by 169 countries, with the United States, India, Pakistan, Turkey, Iran, Iraq, Syria, and Israel being notable exceptions. However, the United States, Iran, and Pakistan signed it on 12 December 1977, which signifies an intention to work towards ratifying it. The Iranian signature was given prior to the 1979 Iranian Revolution.

Introduction 
Historically, international law of armed conflict addressed traditional declarations of war between nations. When the Geneva Conventions were updated in 1949 after the Second World War, delegates sought to define certain minimum humanitarian standards to situations that had all the characteristics of war, without being an international war.

These negotiations resulted in Article 3, common to all four of the basic treaties of the Geneva Conventions of 1949. Common Article 3 applies to armed conflicts that are not of an international character, but that are contained within the boundaries of a single country. It provides limited protection to victims, including:
 Persons taking no active part in hostilities should be treated humanely (including military persons who have ceased to be active as a result of sickness, injury, or detention).
 The wounded and sick shall be collected and cared for.
By the 1970s, diplomats were attempting to negotiate clarifications to the brief language of Article 3, and to extend the scope of international law to cover additional humanitarian rights in the context of internal conflicts. These efforts resulted in Protocol II of the Geneva Conventions. The debate over this protocol centered on two conflicting ideas. First, that the distinction between internal and international armed conflict is artificial from the point of view of a victim. Humanitarian principles should apply regardless of the identity of the combatants. Second, that international law does not apply to non-international situations. A nation has sovereignty within its borders, and must not accept judgments by and orders from other countries.

See also 
 Geneva Conventions
 First Geneva Convention, on the treatment of battlefield casualties.
 Second Geneva Convention, on the treatment of casualties in war at sea.
 Third Geneva Convention, on the treatment of prisoners of war.
 Fourth Geneva Convention, on the treatment of civilians during wartime.
 Protocol I, a 1977 amendment adopted addressing the protection of victims in international conflicts.
 Protocol III, a 2005 amendment adopted specifying the adoption of the Red Crystal emblem.

References

External links 
Committee of the Red Cross: Full text of Protocol II with commentaries
List of countries that have ratified Protocol II
List of countries that have signed but not yet ratified Protocol II
International Review of the Red Cross, 1997 – No. 320 Special issue: 20th anniversary of the 1977 Additional Protocols
 President Reagan's message to the Senate on Protocols I & II 

Geneva Conventions
Treaties concluded in 1977
Treaties entered into force in 1978
Treaties of Afghanistan
Treaties of Albania
Treaties of Algeria
Treaties of Antigua and Barbuda
Treaties of Argentina
Treaties of Armenia
Treaties of Australia
Treaties of Austria
Treaties of the Bahamas
Treaties of Bahrain
Treaties of Bangladesh
Treaties of Barbados
Treaties of the Byelorussian Soviet Socialist Republic
Treaties of Belgium
Treaties of Belize
Treaties of the People's Republic of Benin
Treaties of Bolivia
Treaties of Bosnia and Herzegovina
Treaties of Botswana
Treaties of Brazil
Treaties of Brunei
Treaties of the People's Republic of Bulgaria
Treaties of Burkina Faso
Treaties of Burundi
Treaties of Cambodia
Treaties of Cameroon
Treaties of Canada
Treaties of Cape Verde
Treaties of the Central African Republic
Treaties of Chad
Treaties of Chile
Treaties of the People's Republic of China
Treaties of Colombia
Treaties of the Comoros
Treaties of the Democratic Republic of the Congo
Treaties of the Republic of the Congo
Treaties of the Cook Islands
Treaties of Costa Rica
Treaties of Ivory Coast
Treaties of Croatia
Treaties of Cuba
Treaties of Cyprus
Treaties of the Czech Republic
Treaties of Czechoslovakia
Treaties of Denmark
Treaties of Djibouti
Treaties of Dominica
Treaties of the Dominican Republic
Treaties of East Timor
Treaties of Ecuador
Treaties of Egypt
Treaties of El Salvador
Treaties of Equatorial Guinea
Treaties of Estonia
Treaties of the Transitional Government of Ethiopia
Treaties of Fiji
Treaties of Finland
Treaties of France
Treaties of Gabon
Treaties of the Gambia
Treaties of Georgia (country)
Treaties of Germany
Treaties of Ghana
Treaties of Greece
Treaties of Grenada
Treaties of Guatemala
Treaties of Guinea
Treaties of Guinea-Bissau
Treaties of Guyana
Treaties of Haiti
Treaties of the Holy See
Treaties of Honduras
Treaties of the Hungarian People's Republic
Treaties of Iceland
Treaties of Ireland
Treaties of Italy
Treaties of Jamaica
Treaties of Japan
Treaties of Jordan
Treaties of Kazakhstan
Treaties of Kenya
Treaties of South Korea
Treaties of Kuwait
Treaties of Kyrgyzstan
Treaties of Laos
Treaties of Latvia
Treaties of Lebanon
Treaties of Lesotho
Treaties of Liberia
Treaties of the Libyan Arab Jamahiriya
Treaties of Liechtenstein
Treaties of Lithuania
Treaties of Luxembourg
Treaties of North Macedonia
Treaties of Madagascar
Treaties of Malawi
Treaties of the Maldives
Treaties of Mali
Treaties of Malta
Treaties of Mauritania
Treaties of Mauritius
Treaties of the Federated States of Micronesia
Treaties of Moldova
Treaties of Monaco
Treaties of Mongolia
Treaties of Montenegro
Treaties of Morocco
Treaties of Mozambique
Treaties of Namibia
Treaties of Nauru
Treaties of the Netherlands
Treaties of New Zealand
Treaties of Nicaragua
Treaties of Niger
Treaties of Nigeria
Treaties of Norway
Treaties of Oman
Treaties of Palau
Treaties of the State of Palestine
Treaties of Panama
Treaties of Paraguay
Treaties of Peru
Treaties of the Philippines
Treaties of Poland
Treaties of Portugal
Treaties of Qatar
Treaties of Romania
Treaties of Rwanda
Treaties of Saint Kitts and Nevis
Treaties of Saint Lucia
Treaties of Saint Vincent and the Grenadines
Treaties of Samoa
Treaties of San Marino
Treaties of São Tomé and Príncipe
Treaties of Saudi Arabia
Treaties of Senegal
Treaties of Serbia and Montenegro
Treaties of Seychelles
Treaties of Sierra Leone
Treaties of Slovakia
Treaties of Slovenia
Treaties of the Solomon Islands
Treaties of South Africa
Treaties of South Sudan
Treaties of the Soviet Union
Treaties of Spain
Treaties of the Republic of the Sudan (1985–2011)
Treaties of Suriname
Treaties of Eswatini
Treaties of Sweden
Treaties of Switzerland
Treaties of Tajikistan
Treaties of Tanzania
Treaties of Togo
Treaties of Tonga
Treaties of Trinidad and Tobago
Treaties of Tunisia
Treaties of Turkmenistan
Treaties of Uganda
Treaties of the Ukrainian Soviet Socialist Republic
Treaties of the United Arab Emirates
Treaties of the United Kingdom
Treaties of Uruguay
Treaties of Uzbekistan
Treaties of Vanuatu
Treaties of Venezuela
Treaties of Yemen
Treaties of Yugoslavia
Treaties of Zambia
Treaties of Zimbabwe
Treaties extended to the Faroe Islands
Treaties extended to Greenland
Treaties extended to Aruba
Treaties extended to the Netherlands Antilles
Treaties extended to Anguilla
Treaties extended to Bermuda
Treaties extended to the British Antarctic Territory
Treaties extended to the British Indian Ocean Territory
Treaties extended to the Cayman Islands
Treaties extended to the Falkland Islands
Treaties extended to Montserrat
Treaties extended to the Pitcairn Islands
Treaties extended to Saint Helena, Ascension and Tristan da Cunha
Treaties extended to South Georgia and the South Sandwich Islands
Treaties extended to Akrotiri and Dhekelia
Treaties extended to the Turks and Caicos Islands
Treaties extended to Guernsey
Treaties extended to the Isle of Man
Treaties extended to Jersey
Treaties extended to Hong Kong
Treaties extended to Macau